The Mount Carbon Brewery was a brewery located at 716 South Centre Street, Pottsville, Pennsylvania, (Actually Mount Carbon, Pennsylvania) and which ran from 1845 to 1976 under various owners and names.  Their Motto was "A Mellow Brew from the Mountains".

Timeline 
 George Lauer circa 1845–1860.  Orchard Brewery, so named for the Orchard section of Pottsville.
 Frederick Lauer (Mauck Chunk & Jackson Sts) 18??-1877
 Orchard Brewery 1877–1893. Operated by G. Lorenz Schmidt until his death.
A new brewery was built in 1886 in Mount Carbon by Lorenz Schmidt. Some facilities of the Orchard Brewery were used in the new Brewery.
 Operated under Estate of Lorenz Schmidt, Mount Carbon Brewery (Main St, Mount Carbon) 1893–1906.
 Schmidt Estate Brewing Co., Mount Carbon Brewery 1906-1908
 Mellet & Nichter Brewing Co. 1908-1920
 Prohibition in 1920-1933
 Matthew Kelley, trading as Mt. Carbon Brewery 1933-1935
 Mount Carbon Brewery, 1935-1976

Products 
The following brand names were produced at the Mount Carbon Brewery.  Production ceased in 1976 and brand licensing was sold to D. G. Yuengling & Son. 
 Mount Carbon Ale 1933 - 1951
 Mount Carbon Beer 1933 - 1951
 Double Pilsener Beer 1934 - 1938
 Mount Carbon Half & Half 1934 - 1939
 Mount Carbon Bock 1934 - 1941
 Mount Carbon Münchner Style October Beer 1935 - 1941
 Mount Carbon Lager Beer (Under Matthew Kelly)
 Mount Carbon Pale Ale
 M.C. Ale 1935 - 1943
 M.C. Bock 1935 - 1943
 M.C. Porter 1935 - 1943
 M.C. Beer 1935 - 1943
 M.C. De Luxe Pilsner Beer
 Franklin Ale 1935 - 1945
 Mount Carbon Porter 1935 - 1977
 Bavarian Type [Premium] Beer 1941 - 1977, continued to be produced by D.G. Yuengling & Son until 1994.
 Old German Beer 1942 - 1949, produced by D.G. Yuengling & Son until 1994.
 Old Bohemian Beer 1942 - 1977
 Dix Club Beer 1944 - 1947
 Old Dutch Beer 1944 - 1949
 Franklin Beer 1945 - 1948
 Lord Salisbury Ale 1945 - 1975
 Old Fashioned Beer 1947 - 1951
 Club Society Beer 1953 - 1956
 Bavarian Type Bock 1953 - 1977

See also 
Mount Carbon, Pennsylvania, The old Mount Carbon Brewery.

References 

Beer brewing companies based in Pennsylvania
Pottsville, Pennsylvania